The Cowboy Millionaire is a 1909 American silent short Western film directed by Francis Boggs and Otis Turner. The film stars Tom Mix, Mac Barnes and William Garwood. It was the debut film of Mix and Garwood, as well as William Stowell.

Plot
Cowboy from Idaho gets letter from Chicago, reporting that his uncle died and left him a fortune of several million dollars.

Cast
 Tom Mix
 Mac Barnes
 William Garwood
 Adrienne Kroell
 William Stowell
 Carl Winterhoff

See also
 Tom Mix filmography

External links
 

1909 films
1909 Western (genre) films
1909 short films
American silent short films
American black-and-white films
Films directed by Otis Turner
Films set in England
Selig Polyscope Company films
Silent American Western (genre) films
1900s English-language films
1900s American films